George Grant Gatley (September 10, 1868—January 8, 1931) was a career officer in the United States Army.  He attained the rank of brigadier general, and his World War I commands included the 30th and 42nd Infantry Divisions.

Early life
George G. Gatley was born in Portland, Maine on September 10, 1868, a son of Richard K. Gatley and Sarah (Markham) Gatley. He attended the public schools of Portland, and graduated from the United States Military Academy in 1890. Ranked 25 of 54, he was commissioned in the Field Artillery. He served initially with the 5th Field Artillery, and later with the 2nd and 3rd Field Artillery.

Start of career
During the Spanish–American War, Gatley commanded Battery K, 5th Field Artillery; after completing mobilization and deployment training, his battery was at the Tampa, Florida port of embarkation awaiting transport to Cuba when the war ended. He was promoted to captain in 1901, and served in the Philippines during the Moro Rebellion as commander of the 17th Field Artillery Battery.

Gatley served in Cuba from 1906 to 1913, first as part of the U.S. occupation force, and later as an artillery trainer and instructor for the Cuban Army; he was promoted to major in 1911. He was with the 13th Field Artillery on the Mexican border during the Pancho Villa Expedition; from 1915 to 1917 he was a member of the Army's Ordnance Board, which designed and tested new cannons, and made recommendations about which ones to procure. He was promoted to lieutenant colonel in 1916, and colonel in May, 1917.

World War I
In August 1917, Gatley was promoted to brigadier general as commander of the 55th Field Artillery Brigade, a unit of the 30th Division. He subsequently transferred to command of the 67th Field Artillery Brigade of the 42nd Division, which he led until the end of the war. He took part in the Champagne-Marne, Aisne-Marne, St. Mihiel, and Meuse-Argonne battles and offensives. From December 1917 to January 1918, Gatley commanded the 30th Division.  In 1919 he commanded the 42nd Division during part of its post-war occupation duty in Germany.

Later career
Gatley commanded the 8th Field Artillery Brigade at Fort Knox, Kentucky from 1919 to 1920, and graduated from the Army War College in 1921.  From 1921 to 1924, he commanded the 10th Field Artillery at Camp Pike, Arkansas and Fort Lewis, Washington. Gatley commanded the Overseas Discharge and Replacement Depot at Fort McDowell, California from 1924 to 1929.

Death and burial
He was commander of the 15th Field Artillery Brigade when he became ill in December, 1929. He was hospitalized at Walter Reed Army Medical Center until April, 1930, when he was transferred to Letterman Army Hospital in San Francisco. Gatley died in San Francisco, California on January 8, 1931. He was buried at San Francisco National Cemetery, Section OS, Row 1, Site 11.

At his death, Gatley held the permanent rank of colonel. His rank of brigadier general was restored after he died as the result of a 1930 law which allowed World War I generals to retire at the highest rank they had held.

Family
In 1897, Gatley married Elizabeth "Bessie" Walton Crabb (1876–1954), the daughter of Major George W. Crabb of the 5th Field Artillery.  They were the parents of two daughters: Edith (1898–1985), the wife of Robert T. Nash and John Donald MacKenzie; and Dorothy (1902–1981), an actress whose stage name was Ann Harding.

References

Sources

Books

Newspapers

Internet

External links

1868 births
1931 deaths
United States Military Academy alumni
United States Army War College alumni
American military personnel of the Spanish–American War
Burials at San Francisco National Cemetery
United States Army Field Artillery Branch personnel
United States Army generals of World War I
United States Army generals
Military personnel from Maine